Japan and Tonga have maintained official diplomatic relations since July 1970. Japan is Tonga's leading donor in the field of technical aid. The Japanese government describes its relations with Tonga as "excellent", and states that "the Imperial family of Japan and the Royal family of Tonga have developed a cordial and personal relationship over the years". Japan is one of only four countries to have an embassy in Nuku'alofa, whilst Tonga has an embassy in Tokyo.

In early 2009, Japan became the fourth country to establish an embassy in Tonga (following Australia, New Zealand and the People's Republic of China). In March, Ambassador Yasuo Takase became the first resident ambassador of Japan in Tonga. He was also the first resident Japanese ambassador in any Polynesian country.

The opening of the embassy came in a context of increased Japanese development aid in the Pacific.

State visits
In May 2009, Tongan Prime Minister Feleti Sevele was welcomed to Japan by Emperor Akihito for a regional discussion on aid.

Taufaʻahau Tupou IV (King of Tonga from 1965 to 2006) visited Japan on seven occasions.

Trade
In 2013, Tonga's exports to Japan (consisting primarily in pumpkins and tuna) were worth JPY 146 million, while its imports (mainly machinery) were worth JPY 460 million. Japan is Tonga's largest export market.

Diplomatic missions 
Japan has sent only bureaucratic diplomats as ambassadors to Tonga. On the other hand, however, one of the Tongan ambassadors is a member of the royal family, Crown Prince Tupouto'a Lavaka (2010–2012).

References

External links 
 Embassy of Japan in Tonga
 Embassy of Tonga in Japan

 
Tonga
Japan